The Evinos is a  river in western Greece, flowing into the Gulf of Patras. Its source is in the northern Vardousia mountains, near the village Artotina, Phocis. The river flows in a generally southwestern direction, for most of its length in Aetolia-Acarnania. It feeds the reservoir of Lake Evinos, that is about 10 km². The river flows through a deep forested valley with few small villages. In its lower course it flows through lowlands, and it empties into the Gulf of Patras 10 km southeast of Missolonghi. The village Evinochori near its mouth owes its name to this river.

Evinos artificial lake
Due to the flooding of the area, a new dam was ordered by the Aitoloakarnanian government to construct a dam near the four-boundaries region of northern Nafpaktia.  It took nearly one year and was completed in 2003.  Its area is about 5 to 10 km², the height and the depth is approximately 50 m. It rarely supplies water to the area, but it is the westernmost and newest expansion of the water supply line Evinos-Mornos-Yliki-Marathon which covers the needs of Athens. It is connected to the existing Mornos expansion via an underground pipeline 30 km long and further to Athens.

Places near the river
Grammeni Oxya
Perdikovrysi
Agios Dimitrios
Stranoma
Trikorfo
Evinochori
Galatas

History

The river was first mentioned in Homeric times.

External links

Evinos River on GTP Travel Pages (in English and Greek)

Landforms of Aetolia-Acarnania
Rivers of Greece
Rivers of Western Greece
Drainage basins of the Ionian Sea